Somtax (Som Tax also as Sumutashi) is a township of Akqi County in Xinjiang Uygur Autonomous Region, China. Located in the middle of the county, it covers an area of 1,848 kilometres with a population of 5,086 (as of 2017), the main ethnic group is Kyrgyz. The township has 4 administrative villages (as of 2018) and 10 unincorporated villages under jurisdiction, its seat is at Aktala Village.

The name of som tax was from the Kyrgyz language, meaning "rectangular stone". Here the rocks are mostly rectangular, the place is named after it. The township is located in the middle of the county, 20 kilometers west of the county seat Akqi Town.

History
It was formerly part of the 1st district in 1950 and the 2nd district in 1954, Somtax Commune was established in 1958, it was renamed to Quanwudi Commune and its seat was move to Aktala from Somtax in 1969. Its name was back to Somtax Commune in 1978, and the commune was re-organized as a township in 1984.

Administrative divisions
 Kezilgumbaz Village 
 Aktala Village 
 kungulaq Village 
 Somtax Village

Overview
Somtax is known as the land of falcons in China; Jilusu Hot Spring is an important holiday destination. The township is located in the southwest of the county. Animal husbandry is its main industry,  combined with agriculture. The main crops are wheat, barley, corn, broad beans, hemp and rape. The provincial road S306 passes through the township.

References 

Township-level divisions of Akqi County